A'Shawn Robinson (born March 21, 1995) is an American football defensive end who is a free agent. He played college football at Alabama and was drafted by the Detroit Lions in the second round of the 2016 NFL Draft.

Robinson was a five-star recruit out of high school, with one service listing him as the nation's top defensive tackle. Robinson played in all 13 of Alabama's games in the 2013 season and started in two games. Robinson was the only true freshman under head coach Nick Saban at Alabama to lead the team in sacks. At 320 pounds, Robinson would line-up at both defensive end and tackle for Alabama during his freshman season. In his junior season, he appeared at fullback in goal line situations in games against LSU and Michigan State in addition to starting on the defensive line. He also holds the deadlift record at West Deptford High School with 765 pounds.

High school career
A native of Fort Worth, Texas, Robinson attended Arlington Heights High School. In addition to football, he competed on his high school's varsity basketball and track & field teams. A two-way lineman for the Arlington Heights Yellowjackets football team, Robinson was coached by Todd Whitten in his senior season. After the season, Robinson played for the West squad in the U.S. Army All-American Bowl, and was selected to the 2012 USA Today All-American Second-team.

Considered a five-star recruit by Rivals.com, Robinson was listed as the No. 4 defensive tackle in the nation in 2013. ESPN listed him as a four-star recruit and ranked him 105th overall on their "ESPN 300" ranking. Robinson chose to attend Alabama over Texas, Southern California, Louisiana State, Arkansas, and Florida State. He was originally verbally committed to attend Texas as of February 2012. Just prior to National Signing Day in February 2013, however, he de-committed from Texas and officially signed with Alabama.

College career

Freshman year (2013)
Robinson started practicing with Alabama in August 2013 and played in the first game of Alabama's 2013 season on August 31, 2013. Robinson and tight end O. J. Howard were Alabama's only true freshmen to have both started a game and played in every game of the 2013 season. Robinson was also the only true freshman under head coach Nick Saban at Alabama to lead the team in sacks.

Robinson led Alabama in sacks and was seventh on the team in tackles. He was named by Alabama's coaches as one of the defensive "players of the week" in three of Alabama's 12 games. No other true freshman was a "player of the week" on offense or defense during the 2013 season. At Alabama's annual awards banquet after the 2013 regular season Robinson was one of four players to receive an "Iron Man Award" given to players who have shown the most dedication to the individual and team goals of the Crimson Tide's year-round strength and conditioning program.

At the end of his first college football season Robinson was the only Alabama freshman named to the SEC Coaches' All-Freshman team. Robinson was also on the 2013 Sporting News Freshman All-American team.

Sophomore year (2014)
Robinson was selected to the 2014 first-team in the pre-season Media Days All-SEC Team. He was held out of some practices in August due to a sprained knee. He led his team in tackles in the 2014 SEC Championship game versus Missouri. It was the first time in his career that he led the team in tackles. He started every game in the 2014 season, during which Alabama led the nation in rushing defense. His teammates gave him the nickname of "Infamous A-Tron," a blend of A'Shawn and Megatron. Robinson earned Honorable Mention on the All-SEC team after the 2014 season.

Junior year (2015)
Robinson started every game for the second season in a row and anchored a deep defensive line that helped Alabama lead college football in rushing yards allowed per game, yards per carry allowed per game, and sacks. Robinson led Alabama in quarterback hurries and was a finalist for the Outland Trophy, an award for the nation's best interior lineman (both offensive and defensive). Robinson did not win the Outland Trophy, and the Alabama football team used this snub as motivation in their College Football Playoff game against Michigan State. After the season, Robinson decided to forgo his senior year and enter the 2016 NFL Draft.

Professional career

Detroit Lions

Robinson was selected in the second round with the 46th overall pick by the Detroit Lions in the 2016 NFL Draft. On May 10, 2016, Robinson signed with the Detroit Lions. He recorded his first career sack against Philadelphia Eagles quarterback Carson Wentz in Week 5. In Week 16 of the 2016 season, against the Dallas Cowboys, Robinson drew an unnecessary roughness penalty for tackling running back Ezekiel Elliott too hard. The motion Robinson used on the tackle made it look like he was picking up Elliot and slamming him down, but the announcers agreed that the hit looked clean. He finished his rookie season leading all defensive tackles in the NFL in pass deflections with seven.

During Week 6 of the 2017 NFL season, Robinson recorded his first career interception off Drew Brees and returned it two yards for a touchdown. However, the Lions still lost to the New Orleans Saints by a score of 52–38. In Week 9, he blocked a Mason Crosby field goal to help the Lions beat the Green Bay Packers at Lambeau Field by a score of 30–17.

In the 2018 season, Robinson played in 13 games with seven starts, recording 49 tackles, one sack, and one forced fumble. He was placed on injured reserve on December 28, 2018.

In the 2019 season, Robinson played in 13 games with nine starts, recording 40 tackles, 1.5 sacks, and one forced fumble.

Los Angeles Rams
On April 24, 2020, the Los Angeles Rams signed Robinson to a two-year contract. He was placed on the active/non-football injury list at the start of training camp on August 8, 2020. He was placed on reserve/non-football injury to start the season. He was activated on October 30, 2020. Robinson helped the Rams win Super Bowl LVI by defeating the Cincinnati Bengals 23–20. In the Super Bowl, Robinson recorded 6 tackles and 1 sack and was instrumental in shutting down the Bengals running game.

On November 26, 2022, Robinson was placed on injured reserve.

Personal life
Due to his physical appearance, Robinson is often questioned of his actual age.  Having started playing football at the age of 4, his mother stated that she would bring his birth certificate to games, due to opposing coaches challenging his age for eligibility. "I couldn't play because I was too big and they had to see my birth certificate," said Robinson.  This would continue into his adult years; he shared that he was often mistaken for a 35-year-old coach when he was actually a 20-year-old student athlete.

References

External links
Los Angeles Rams bio
Alabama Crimson Tide bio

1995 births
Living people
American football defensive tackles
All-American college football players
Alabama Crimson Tide football players
Detroit Lions players
Los Angeles Rams players
Players of American football from Fort Worth, Texas